Luis Felipe Calderón Blet (2 May 1952 – 17 June 2009) was a Cuban volleyball player. He competed in the men's tournament at the 1972 Summer Olympics.

References

External links
 

1952 births
2009 deaths
Cuban men's volleyball players
Olympic volleyball players of Cuba
Volleyball players at the 1972 Summer Olympics
Sportspeople from Havana